The Florida scrub jay (Aphelocoma coerulescens) is one of the species of scrub jay native to North America. It is the only species of bird endemic to the U.S. state of Florida and one of only 15 species endemic to the continental United States. Because of this, it is keenly sought by birders. It is known to have been present in Florida as a distinct species for at least 2 million years, and is possibly derived from the ancestors of Woodhouse's scrub jay.

It has a strong black bill, blue head and nape without a crest, a whitish forehead and supercilium, blue bib, blue wings, grayish underparts, gray back, long blue tail, black legs and feet.

Ecology
The Florida scrub jay is found only in Florida scrub habitat, an ecosystem that exists only in central Florida and in limited areas along the Atlantic coast, and is characterized by nutrient-poor soil, occasional drought, and frequent wildfires. Because of its being isolated from the mainland as an island ("Orange Island") 34 to 28 million years ago  and somewhat harsh weather pattern, this habitat in isolation evolved to host not only the Florida scrub jay endemic only to Florida, but also a small assortment of very ancient specific plants, including sand pine, sand live oak, myrtle oak, Chapman's oak, sandhill oak, Florida rosemary and various other hardy plants such as Eastern prickly pear.

Florida scrub jays are omnivorous and eat a wide variety of acorns, seeds, peanuts, insects, tree frogs, turtles, snakes, lizards, and young mice. They have also been occasionally observed to eat other birds' eggs or nestlings, but this occurs rarely. They routinely cache thousands of acorns a year, burying them just beneath the surface. The acorns are typically buried in the fall and consumed during the winter and spring. Acorns that are forgotten or missed may germinate, making the Florida Scrub-Jay an effective agent for the dispersal of a variety of oak trees.

The Florida scrub jay may exhibit coordinated cooperative hunting, as seen in one case where a mated pair of the birds were observed attacking a black racer together in southcentral Florida. The snake may have been too large for one jay to kill it alone, and the pair ultimately succeeded in killing the reptile. Cooperated hunting like this is rarely documented in passerines.

Scrub jays may also take silverware and other shiny objects in a manner similar to the American crow.

Reproduction
Florida scrub jays are one of the few cooperative breeding birds in North America. Fledglings remain in their parents' habitat for several years and help to rear young, watch for predators (such as short-tailed hawks or Accipiters), and defend territory against neighboring Florida scrub jay family groups. These families can range in size from 2 to 8.

 After about 2 to 3 years, fledglings leave the group to form mating pairs of their own. Mating season ranges from March to June. Clutches usually contain about 3 to 4 eggs which are incubated in about 17 days. Fledging occurs in about 16 to 19 days. Fledglings can be distinguished from the adult birds due to the coloration of the feathers on their head, which are brown instead of blue. The brown feathers on the juvenile's head are slowly replaced by blue feathers as the bird matures into adulthood.

Conservation

Scrub habitat has dwindled considerably in the past several decades as Florida has continued to develop. Wildfire suppression also leads to the natural succession of large oaks and trees which changes the habitat. In recent years, environmental groups within the state have made a strong effort at preserving Florida's remaining scrub through controlled burns and even clearing out areas of large trees to increase the size of a scrub habitat. Because scrub habitat is typically "well-drained sites with low nutrient levels and periodic fires," the species is vulnerable to climate change. Oscar Scherer State Park near Sarasota has one of the larger habitats under state management.

The Florida scrub jay was officially listed as a threatened state species by Florida Fish and Wildlife Conservation Commission in 1975 and it was listed as a threatened federal species by the United States Fish and Wildlife Service in 1987.

According to Partners in Flight, there were estimated to be 4000 individuals left in the wild. Despite the protections, the Florida scrub jay is still thought to be on the decline. Studies done in Brevard County, once the county with the greatest population of scrub jays, has noted declines of some 33% since the 1993 census alone.

Another attempt to conserve the bird is an ongoing campaign to name the Florida scrub jay as the new state bird of Florida. The main argument for changing the state bird is that the current state bird (viz. the northern mockingbird) is the state bird of several other states, while the scrub jay is exclusive to Florida.

In recent years there has been some debate about whether or not the Florida scrub jay should be officially listed as an Endangered Species because of the loss of homes. However, environmentalists hope that current conservation efforts should help the species population to at least stabilize.

On the other hand, the IUCN classifies this species as vulnerable to extinction. In 2004, the population was declining and no more than 10 subpopulations were known. Both the number of adult birds as well as amount and quality of habitat were in decline, and local subpopulations were in danger of disappearing altogether. About 8000 mature birds were believed to exist—with no more than 1000 in any one subpopulation—and population numbers had dropped by about 10% over the last decade or so.

A long-term and ongoing study of the Florida scrub jay has been taking place at the Archbold Biological Station at Lake Placid.

The Florida scrub jay was featured in episode 11, season 3 of the Showtime television series Penn & Teller: Bullshit!.

Dangers of human feeding
An inquisitive and intelligent species, the most striking attribute of the Florida scrub jay's behavior is its remarkable tameness. As such, scrub jays willingly take food from human hands.

Unfortunately, this tameness is dangerous to the well-being of the species. Florida scrub jays that are fed by humans will reproduce earlier in the year than those that are not.  However, fledgling scrub jays feed primarily on caterpillars present in the late spring and summer; if they hatch too early in the year when the caterpillars are not available, this can lead to their malnutrition or starvation.

Another potential danger of feeding Florida scrub jays occurs when people feed them near a road, as one major cause of death for scrub jays in urban areas is collision with vehicles.
Since humans build subdivisions, railroads, and highways on the highest and driest ground, where Florida scrub jays like to live, this removal of habitats, along with the introduction of pets, especially cats not on a leash, has devastated scrub jay populations. In the last 100 years, 90% of the bird's population has been lost.

Gallery

Footnotes 

 Etymology: Aphelocoma, from Latinized Ancient Greek apheles- (from ἀφελής-) "simple" + Latin coma (from Greek kome κόμη) "hair", in reference to the lack of striped or banded feathers in this genus, compared to other jays. coerulescens, Latin for "becoming blue", in reference to the species' color which is lighter than in most American jays.

References

Further reading 
Alsop, Fred (2002): Smithsonian Handbooks: Birds of Florida. DK Pub., New York. 
 Brevard County Natural Resources Management Office (2005): An Ecological Overview of Scrub Habitat and Florida Scrub-Jays in Brevard County . Retrieved April 12, 2005.
 Florida Natural Areas Inventory (2001): Florida Scrub-jay. In: Field Guide to the Rare Plants and Animals of Florida. PDF fulltext 
Goodwin, Derek & Gillmor, Robert (1986): Crows of the World (2nd ed). British Museum of Natural History. 
 Madge, Steve & Burn, Hilary (1994): Crows and jays: a guide to the crows, jays and magpies of the world. A&C Black, London. 
Morse, R. (2000): Richard Archbold and the Archbold Biological Station. University Press of Florida: Gainesville. 
Woolfenden, Glen E. & Fitzpatrick, John W. (1996): Florida Scrub-Jay (Aphelocoma coerulescens). In: Poole, A. & Gill, F. (eds.): The Birds of North America 228. The Academy of Natural Sciences, Philadelphia, PA & The American Ornithologists' Union, Washington, D.C. Online version, retrieved 2006-10-11.

External links 

Florida Scrub-Jay on All About Birds by the Cornell Lab of Ornithology
Florida Scrub Jay Aphelocoma coerulescens. USGS Patuxent Bird Identification InfoCenter.
Florida Scrub-Jay WatchList Species Account from the American Bird Conservancy
Florida Scrub-Jay Campaign mentions the movement to adopt the Scrub-Jay as Florida's State Bird
Florida Scrub-Jay photo gallery – VIREO
Florida Scrub Scrub-Jay Sound
Florida Scrub-Jay call from Cornell Lab of Ornithology (RealMedia format).

Florida scrub-jay
Endemic birds of the Eastern United States
Native birds of the Southeastern United States
Endemic fauna of Florida
Florida scrub-jay
Florida scrub-jay
ESA threatened species